Michael Conway (born 3 March 1953) is a Canadian rowing coxswain. He competed in the men's coxed four event at the 1972 Summer Olympics.

References

1953 births
Living people
Canadian male rowers
Olympic rowers of Canada
Rowers at the 1972 Summer Olympics
Rowers from Sydney
Pan American Games medalists in rowing
Pan American Games silver medalists for Canada
Pan American Games bronze medalists for Canada
Rowers at the 1971 Pan American Games
Rowers at the 1979 Pan American Games
20th-century Canadian people
21st-century Canadian people